Ayam kodok ( in Indonesian) is an Indonesian stuffed and roasted chicken, commonly served as a holiday staple during Christmas and other special occasions. The dish dates back to the colonial era, likely related to gevulde kip, the Dutch stuffed chicken dish.

Preparation
Ayam kodok preparation requires deboning a chicken, and then stuffing it with a mixture of seasoned meat and vegetables, and a hard boiled egg. The chicken is then optionally steamed before it is roasted.

See also 

 Ayam goreng
 Ikan bakar
 List of chicken dishes

References 

Indonesian chicken dishes